Harvey Fitch (May 27, 1816 – August 6, 1890) was Warden of the Borough of Norwalk, Connecticut from 1868 to 1869.

He was born in Wilton, Connecticut on May 27, 1816, the son of Daniel Fitch and Lucretia Whitney. He married Rebecca Betts on May 29, 1838. They lived in Wilton until 1848, when they moved to Norwalk.

References 

1816 births
1890 deaths
American grocers
Mayors of Norwalk, Connecticut
People from Wilton, Connecticut
19th-century American politicians
19th-century American Episcopalians
19th-century American businesspeople